Deep Freeze Ice Arena is  located in Boardman, Ohio, a suburb of Youngstown, Ohio. Deep Freeze Ice Arena has  one Olympic-sized ice sheet.
New owners have taken over. The rink used to be called The Ice Zone but has been bought  by the owner of the Boardman Extreme Air and is now renamed, Deep Freeze Ice Arena. It currently serves as the USHL Youngstown Phantoms practice facility.

Controversy emerged after the owners of Extreme Air purchased the Ice Zone, when the freon from the ice compressor machines was stolen, possibly by associates of Bruce Zoldan, the previous owner. Also, the ice was melted before possession was transferred to the new owners. This resulted in an interruption of operations at the Ice Zone; youth programs such as ice hockey and figure skating lost ice time as a result. According to Zoldan, the new owners bought the building, not the equipment.

References

External links
Ice Zone official site
Phantoms official site
Youngstown State University Hockey
WKBN local news report

Indoor ice hockey venues in Ohio
College ice hockey venues in the United States
Buildings and structures in Mahoning County, Ohio